In political philosophy, particularly Frankfurt School critical theory, advanced capitalism is the situation that pertains in a society in which the capitalist model has been integrated and developed deeply and extensively and for a prolonged period. The expression advanced capitalism distinguishes such societies from the historical previous forms of capitalism, mercantilism and industrial capitalism, and partially overlaps with the concepts of a developed country; of the post-industrial age; of finance capitalism; of post-Fordism; of the spectacular society; of media culture; and of "developed", "modern", and "complex" capitalism.

Various writers identify Antonio Gramsci as an influential early theorist of advanced capitalism, even if he did not use the term himself. In his writings Gramsci sought to explain how capitalism had adapted to avoid the revolutionary overthrow that had seemed inevitable in the 19th century. At the heart of his explanation was the decline of raw coercion as a tool of class power, replaced by use of civil society institutions to manipulate public ideology in the capitalists' favor.

Jürgen Habermas has been a major contributor to the analysis of advanced-capitalistic societies. Habermas observed four general features that characterize advanced capitalism:
 Concentration of industrial activity in a few large firms
 Constant reliance on the state to stabilize the economic system
 A formally democratic government that legitimizes the activities of the state and dissipates opposition to the system
 The use of nominal wage increases to pacify the most restless segments of the work force

Bibliography
Jürgen Habermas. Legitimation Crisis. Trans. by T. McCarthy. Boston: Beacon, 1973. from google books; excerpt
Sombart, Werner (1916) Der moderne Kapitalismus. Historisch-systematische Darstellung des gesamteuropäischen Wirtschaftslebens von seinen Anfängen bis zur Gegenwart. Final edn. 1916, repr. 1969, paperback edn. (3 vols. in 6): 1987 Munich: dtv.  (Also in Spanish; no English translation yet.)
Ian Gough State Expenditure in Advanced Capitalism New Left Review
Fredric Jameson (1991) Postmodernism, or, the Cultural Logic of Late Capitalism
Ernest Mandel Late Capitalism

See also
Capitalist mode of production
Late capitalism
Post-Fordism
State capitalism
State monopoly capitalism
White Collar: The American Middle Classes

References

Capitalist systems